The Poisoning Act 1530 (22 Hen.8 c.9) was an Act of the Parliament of England. Its long title was "An Act for Poisoning." It made it high treason to murder someone with poison, and instead of the usual punishment for treason (hanging, drawing and quartering) it imposed death by boiling. It was repealed by the Treason Act 1547.

See also
 High treason in the United Kingdom
 Treason Act
 Treason Act 1351

References

External links
 

Acts of the Parliament of England (1485–1603)
1530 in law
Toxicology in the United Kingdom
Treason in England
1530 in England